Jaime Lachica Sin  (August 31, 1928 – June 21, 2005), commonly and formally known as Jaime Cardinal Sin, was the 30th Roman Catholic Archbishop of Manila and the third cardinal from the Philippines. He was instrumental in the historic and peaceful 1986 People Power Revolution, which toppled the dictatorship and ended martial law under Ferdinand Marcos and installed Corazon Aquino as his successor in the Fifth Republic of the Philippines. He was also a key figure in the 2001 EDSA Revolution that replaced President Joseph Estrada with Gloria Macapagal Arroyo.

Early life
Sin was born on August 31, 1928, in New Washington, Aklan, on the island of Panay to Juan Sin, a merchant of Chinese descent, and Máxima Lachica, an ethnic Aklanon. "Jim" as he was known, was his mother's favorite. As the 14th of 16 children he was painfully thin, asthmatic child, who often used to cuddle up between his parents to sleep at night. When he asked his nurse why his mother lavished such attention on him, he was told it was because he was "the weakest and ugliest of the brood".

Life as a priest

Early priesthood 
He left his childhood home and his family to study in St. Vincent Ferrer Seminary, and was ordained a priest of the Archdiocese of Jaro on April 3, 1954. He was the first rector of St. Pius X Seminary in Lawaan Hills, Roxas City, Capiz, serving from 1957 to 1967. On February 29, 1960, he was named Domestic Prelate (now called honorary prelate, with the title of Monsignor).

Bishop of Obba 
He was appointed auxiliary bishop of Jaro on February 10, 1967, and was consecrated bishop of the titular see of Obba on March 18 of that year.

Archbishop of Jaro 
On March 15, 1972, Sin was appointed Coadjutor Archbishop of Jaro, taking on administrative roles in the archdiocese, while holding the titular see of Massa Lubrense. On October 8, 1972, Sin was appointed Archbishop of Jaro.

Archbishop of Manila
Sin was appointed archbishop of Manila on January 21, 1974. Initially, he was reluctant to take on the role of leader of the Catholic Church in the Philippines. He was officially installed as Archbishop of Manila at Manila Cathedral on March 19, 1974, making him only the third native Filipino in the office after centuries of Spanish, American, and Irish archbishops.

On May 24, 1976, Pope Paul VI made him a member of the College of Cardinals, creating him Cardinal Priest of the titular church of Santa Maria ai Monti. As is traditional for cardinals, the title "Cardinal" is inserted before his surname when addressed formally. He participated as a cardinal-elector in both the August 1978 and October 1978 papal conclaves which elected Popes John Paul I and John Paul II respectively. In the August conclave, he reportedly told Albino Luciani, "You will be the new pope." After Luciani was elected as John Paul I, Cardinal Sin paid him homage, and the new pope said: "You were a prophet, but my reign will be a short one." He remained the youngest member of the college until 1983.

His title and surname as "cardinal sin" (another term for a deadly sin) were a point of humour in the Philippines and for Filipino Catholics. Examples included "The greatest sin of all: Cardinal Sin," and even his own pun of "Welcome to the house of Sin" that he used to greet guests at Villa San Miguel, the archiepiscopal palace in Mandaluyong.

1986 People Power Revolution
Events in the Philippines under President Ferdinand Marcos forced Sin, the spiritual leader of Filipino Catholics, to become involved in politics. He became witness to corruption, fraud, and even murder by the regime and rising popular discontent with the dictatorial rule of Marcos and his wife, Imelda. Within six months of his appointment as Archbishop, Sin was criticizing authorities after the military raided a Manila seminary on the grounds that it was harbouring insurgents. Sin appealed to Filipinos of all religions to follow the teachings of Jesus in the Gospels and use peaceful means to change the political situation in the Philippines.

Beginning in the 1970s, Cardinal Sin, a moderate, was among the leaders who publicly pressured President Marcos to end martial law, out of concern that leftist radicals would overthrow the government. Sin eventually decided to speak out in support of Corazon Aquino, the widow of the assassinated opposition leader Benigno Aquino Jr., in calling for an end to martial law. This led to massive popular demonstrations, often led by nuns whom riot police dared not attack. In February 1986, Sin called on Filipinos to surround the police and military headquarters in Manila to protect then-military Vice Chief of Staff Fidel Ramos, who had broken with Marcos. More than one million people took to the streets praying the rosary and singing hymns in an outpouring that shielded anti-government rebels from attack. Some soldiers decided to join the marchers.

In what later became known as the People Power Revolution, Marcos, his family, and close advisors were forced to flee the Philippines and took up residence in Honolulu, Hawaii, US, on the invitation of U.S. President Ronald Reagan. Cardinal Sin, along with presidents Corazon Aquino and Fidel Ramos, became known to Filipinos as the architects of the People Power Movement.

2001 EDSA Revolution
Sin decided to intervene again in 2001 to become spiritual leader of another People Power Movement. Some Filipinos alleged that president Joseph Estrada was guilty of widespread corruption and graft because of the controversial "second envelope". Poor people marching in the streets, with the support of Sin, the elite, and military generals, succeeded in toppling Estrada from power and elevating Gloria Macapagal Arroyo as acting president in what was perceived by the international community as a "triumphant" democracy. The "second envelope" was opened after the coup and turned out to be Estrada's bank account. Commenting on the endemic corruption that persisted after Marcos, Sin said, "We got rid of Ali Baba, but the 40 thieves remained." It was reported that the cardinal's actions caused uneasiness at the Vatican and that he was summoned to Rome to explain himself.

Hours before hundreds of soldiers and officers staged a failed revolt against President Gloria Macapagal Arroyo in July 2003, Sin urged Filipinos to be vigilant against groups plotting to violently overturn the country's democratic institutions.

Two and a half years after Sin's death, it was reported that at the height of EDSA II, Sin received a directive from the Vatican ordering him and the Philippine clergy to adopt a non-partisan stance towards the political crisis. Sin, who by then had committed support for the EDSA II revolt, was said to have threatened to resign as archbishop if compelled to withdraw his support. The standoff was reportedly resolved with the mediation of the Supreme Court Associate Justice Artemio Panganiban (later, Chief Justice of the Philippines), a member of the Pontifical Council for the Laity, a department of the Roman Curia. As a result, the Vatican did not persist with its earlier demand. The reports were attributed to persons reputed to have first-hand knowledge of the events, but they were not confirmed officially by the Vatican or the Archdiocese of Manila.

Retirement and death
Sin retired as Archbishop of Manila on September 15, 2003, and was succeeded by Lipa Archbishop Gaudencio Borbon Rosales. He was too ill to travel to the 2005 papal conclave that elected Pope Benedict XVI. Afflicted for years with a kidney ailment brought on by diabetes, he was taken on June 19, 2005, to the Cardinal Santos Medical Center in San Juan, Metro Manila, because of a slight but lingering fever. He died of renal failure on June 21, 2005, at the age of 76, two months before his 77th birthday. The government accorded him the honour of a state funeral and a period of national mourning through Presidential Proclamation No. 863, s. 2005 signed by President Gloria Macapagal Arroyo. He was buried beside his three immediate predecessors in the crypt of Manila Cathedral after a funeral attended by thousands of Filipinos.

Honors and awards

National honors
: Philippine Legion of Honor, Chief Commander (CCLH)
: Order of Sikatuna, Grand Collar (GCS)
: Order of Lakandula, Grand Cross (GCrL)
: Knights of Rizal, Knight Grand Cross of Rizal (KGCR)

Foreign honor
: Order of Isabella the Catholic, Knight Grand Cross (gcYC) -  (June 24, 1977)

Sin also received 26 honorary doctorates in various fields from higher education institutions in the Philippines and abroad (mostly from notable universities in the United States of America), among which are the Pontifical and Royal University of Santo Tomas in Manila, Yale University, Georgetown University, Brandeis University and Boston College.

Views on Catholic social issues

Views on condom use
As a predominantly Catholic country, issues in the Philippines have and are influenced by the church to varying degrees. Condom usage has historically been a controversial topic. As the incumbent Archbishop of Manila in 1996, when the government distributed condoms to curb HIV infection rates, Sin called the programme "intrinsically evil", in line with Church teaching on the matter. Sin also denounced then-Health Secretary Juan Flavier, with some asserting that the latter's condom promotion had made him an unwitting agent of Satan. Prominent Catholics also protested against the government's condom-distribution programme by publicly burning boxes of condoms.

References

External links

"Philippine Cardinal Jaime L. Sin Dies at 76". Washington Post Retrieved 2011-09-18.
Archdiocese of Manila Biostatistics
Catholic Hierarchy – Jaime Lachica Cardinal Sin †

1928 births
2005 deaths
Hokkien people
Roman Catholic archbishops of Manila
Ateneo de Manila University alumni
Deaths from kidney failure
Filipino cardinals
Filipino democracy activists
People from Aklan
People from Iloilo
Nonviolence advocates
Cardinals created by Pope Paul VI
Chief Commanders of the Philippine Legion of Honor
Grand Crosses of the Order of Lakandula
Filipino revolutionaries
20th-century Roman Catholic archbishops in the Philippines
21st-century Roman Catholic archbishops in the Philippines
Burials at the Manila Cathedral
Visayan people
People of the People Power Revolution
Individuals honored at the Bantayog ng mga Bayani
Religious workers honored at the Bantayog ng mga Bayani
Filipino politicians of Chinese descent
Roman Catholic archbishops of Jaro
Roman Catholic Archdiocese of Manila
Presidents of the Catholic Bishops' Conference of the Philippines
Deaths from diabetes